CICE is a computer model that simulates the growth, melt and movement of sea ice.  It has been integrated into many coupled climate system models as well as global ocean and weather forecasting models and is often used as a tool in Arctic and Southern Ocean research. CICE development began in the mid-1990s by the United States Department of Energy (DOE), and it is currently maintained and developed by a group of institutions in North America and Europe known as the CICE Consortium. Its widespread use in earth system science in part owes to the importance of sea ice in determining Earth's planetary albedo, the strength of the global thermohaline circulation in the world's oceans, and in providing surface boundary conditions for atmospheric circulation models, since sea ice occupies a significant proportion (4-6%) of earth's surface. CICE is a type of cryospheric model.

Development

Development of CICE began in 1994 by Elizabeth Hunke at Los Alamos National Laboratory (LANL). Since its initial release in 1998 following development of the Elastic-Viscous-Plastic (EVP) sea ice rheology within the model, it has been substantially developed by an international community of model users and developers. Enthalpy-conserving thermodynamics and improvements to the sea ice thickness distribution were added to the model between 1998 and 2005. The first institutional user outside of LANL was Naval Postgraduate School in the late-1990s, where it was subsequently incorporated into the Regional Arctic System Model (RASM) in 2011.  The National Center for Atmospheric Research (NCAR) was the first to incorporate CICE into a global climate model in 2002, and developers of the NCAR Community Earth System Model (CESM) have continued to contribute to CICE innovations and have used it to investigate polar variability in Earth's climate system. The United States Navy began using CICE shortly after 2000 for polar research and sea ice forecasting and it continues to do so today. Since 2000, CICE development or coupling to oceanic and atmospheric models for weather and climate prediction has occurred at the University of Reading, University College London, the U.K. Met Office Hadley Centre, Environment and Climate Change Canada, the Danish Meteorological Institute, the Commonwealth Science and Industrial Research Organisation, and Beijing Normal University, among other institutions. As a result of model development in the global community of CICE users, the model's computer code now includes a comprehensive saline ice physics and biogeochemistry library that incorporates mushy-layer thermodynamics, anisotropic continuum mechanics, Delta-Eddington radiative transfer, melt-pond physics and land-fast ice.  CICE version 6 is open-source software and was released in 2018 on GitHub.

Keystone Equations 
There are two main physics equations solved using numerical methods in CICE that underpin the model's predictions of sea ice thickness, concentration and velocity, as well as predictions made with many equations not shown here giving, for example, surface albedo, ice salinity, snow cover, divergence, and biogeochemical cycles. The first keystone equation is Newton's second law for sea ice:

Each of the terms require information about the ice thickness, roughness, and concentration, as well as the state of the atmospheric and oceanic boundary layers. Ice mass per unit area   is determined using the second keystone equation in CICE, which describes evolution of the sea ice thickness distribution  for different thicknesses  spread of the area for which sea ice velocity is calculated above:

where  is the change in the thickness distribution due to thermodynamic growth and melt,  is redistribution function due to sea ice mechanics and is associated with internal ice stress , and  describes advection of sea ice in a Lagrangian reference frame. From this, ice mass is given by:

for density  of sea ice.

Code Design

CICE version 6 is coded in FORTRAN90. It is organized into a dynamical core (dycore) and a separate column physics package called Icepack, which is maintained as a CICE submodule on GitHub. CICE can be run independently, as in the first figure on this page, but is frequently coupled with earth systems models through an external flux coupler, such as the CESM Flux Coupler from NCAR for which results are shown in the second figure for the CESM Large Ensemble. The column physics were separated into Icepack for the version 6 release to permit insertion into earth system models that use their own sea ice dynamical core, including the new DOE Energy Exascale Earth System Model (E3SM), which uses an unstructured grid in the sea ice component of the Model for Prediction Across Scales (MPAS), as demonstrated in the final figure.

See also 

 Sea ice
 Sea ice microbial communities 
 Sea ice emissivity modeling
 Sea ice growth processes
 Sea ice concentration
 Sea ice thickness
 Sea ice physics and ecosystem experiment
 Arctic Ocean
 Southern Ocean
 Climate model
 Weather forecasting
 Northern Sea Route
 Northwest Passage
 Antarctica

References

External links 
CICE Consortium GitHub Information Page
CICE Consortium Model for Sea-Ice Development
Icepack: Essential Physics for Sea Ice Models
Community-Driven Sea Ice Modeling with the CICE Consortium (Witness the Arctic)
NOAA press release
Oceans Deeply
Pacific Standard
phys.org: Arctic ice model upgrade to benefit polar research, industry and military
Sea ice:  More than just frozen water (Santa Fe New Mexican)
Energy Exascale Earth System Model (E3SM)
Community Earth System Model (CESM)

Sea ice
Numerical climate and weather models
Physical oceanography
Physics software